Vasili Streltsov (born January 31, 1990) is a Russian professional ice hockey forward who currently plays for Sokol Krasnoyarsk in the Supreme Hockey League (VHL).

He joined Lada alongside twin brother, Alexander, after playing with Avtomobilist Yekaterinburg.

References

External links

1990 births
Living people
Admiral Vladivostok players
Avtomobilist Yekaterinburg players
HC Lada Togliatti players
Russian ice hockey forwards